USA Gonzo Games is a game show that aired on the USA Network from October 6 to December 29, 1991.  Mark L. Walberg made his debut as a game show host on this series. The show was produced by Stone Stanley Productions.

Premise
Ten contestants (5 male and 5 female) competed in various stunts that tested their endurance.

Each episode was set up in a tournament format, with the top 2 male and female contestants being announced as the winners. Unlike most game shows, USA Gonzo Games did not offer prizes.

References

1990s American game shows
1991 American television series debuts
1991 American television series endings
USA Network original programming
Television series by Stone Stanley Entertainment